Aaron Daniel Wilkerson (born May 24, 1989) is an American professional baseball pitcher for the Leones de Yucatán of the Mexican League. He has played in Major League Baseball (MLB) for the Milwaukee Brewers.

After breaking two pitching records in the National Association of Intercollegiate Athletics for Cumberland University, Wilkerson overcame Tommy John surgery, and four independent league trades in a single season, to join the Boston Red Sox organization. The Red Sox traded him to the Brewers in 2016.

Although he features a four-pitch mix, including a curveball, slider, and changeup, Wilkerson throws the secondary pitches sparingly in comparison to his fastball, which usually sits 91–93 mph and tops out at 95 mph, according to a Red Sox scouting report.

On April 17, 2019, Wilkerson recorded his first MLB hit and home run in the same at bat, hitting a two-run home run off Michael Wacha.

Amateur career
Wilkerson attended Midway High School in Waco, Texas. He enrolled at Cumberland University, where he played college baseball for the Cumberland Bulldogs. With Cumberland, he won a National Association of Intercollegiate Athletics (NAIA) World Series championship in 2010. Wilkerson posted a 14–1 win–loss record with 14 consecutive victories, 11 complete games, and a team-best 2.13 earned run average (ERA) in  innings pitched, while leading the nation with 125 strikeouts and being named both a Second Team All-American and the NAIA World Series All-Tournament Team.

As a senior in 2011, Wilkerson set an NAIA record by pitching 54 consecutive scoreless innings streak from February 9 to April 8. He finished that season with a 12–0 undefeated mark and a 1.49 ERA, closing his college career by setting other NAIA record while winning 26 straight decisions. Besides, he earned First Team All-American honors and was named TranSouth Conference Pitcher of the Week three times.

Doctors revealed that Wilkerson had pitched that season with a frayed ulnar collateral ligament in his right elbow. As a result, he underwent Tommy John surgery went undrafted out of Cumberland in 2011. He left baseball for two years while stocking frozen food shelves.

Professional career

Fort Worth Cats
Wilkerson started his professional career in 2013 with the Fort Worth Cats in the independent United League Baseball. At the time, Wilkerson had to rebuild his mechanics completely with the help of his Fort Worth pitching coach and a private instructor introduced to him by his brother. He had a 9–1 record and a 2.74 ERA in 13 games.

Florence Freedom/Grand Prairie AirHogs
He then was traded to the Florence Freedom of the Frontier League in the midseason, and finished the year with the Grand Prairie AirHogs of the American Association. Overall, he went 10–2 with a 2.96 ERA in 19 starts in the three leagues.

Boston Red Sox
In 2014, Wilkerson was 3–1 with a 3.35 ERA in 13 games for Grand Prairie, before joining the Red Sox organization when his contract was purchased from the AirHogs in August. After that, he went 5–1 with a 1.62 ERA in eight starts at short-season A-level Lowell Spinners.

After that, Wilkerson posted a 7–2 record with a 2.96 ERA, 1.05 walks plus hits per inning pitched (WHIP) ratio and .218 batting average against in 17 outings (12 starts) for High-A Salem Red Sox in 2015. He then went 4–1 with a 2.66 ERA, 1.01 WHIP and .192 BAA in seven starts for Double-A Portland Sea Dogs. Wilkerson followed with a brief stint in the Arizona Fall League, as the starter sent to the Scottsdale Scorpions from the Red Sox, but he had to left the Scorpions to pitch for the USA squad in the inaugural World Baseball Softball Confederation Premier12 Tournament held in Taiwan and Japan in November 2015.

In 2016, Wilkerson appeared in eight games for Portland, posting a 2–1 record with a 2.12 ERA and .175 BAA, striking out 48 batters while walking 14 in  innings. He then gained a promotion to Triple-A Pawtucket Red Sox in late April. In 41 innings across eight Pawtucket appearances, Wilkerson went 4–1 with a 2.20 ERA, 1.07 WHIP, .222 BAA, 49 strikeouts, and 10 walks.

Milwaukee Brewers
On July 7, 2016, the Red Sox traded Wilkerson and Wendell Rijo to the Milwaukee Brewers for Aaron Hill. He spent the rest of the 2016 season with the Triple-A Colorado Springs Sky Sox. In 2017, he began the season with the Double-A Biloxi Shuckers. On September 15, 2017, Wilkerson was added to the Brewers' 40-man roster.

In 3 major league games for the Brewers in 2018, Wilkerson allowed 10 earned runs in 9 innings, spending the majority of the year in Triple-A with the Colorado Springs Sky Sox. On April 17, 2019 Wilkerson recorded his first MLB hit and home run in the same at bat hitting a two-run home run off Michael Wacha. On September 1, 2019, Wilkerson was designated for assignment after allowing 13 runs in 16.0 innings across 8 appearances in 2019. Wilkerson did not play in a game in 2020 due to the cancellation of the Minor League Baseball season because of the COVID-19 pandemic. He became a free agent on November 2, 2020.

On December 17, 2020, Wilkerson signed with the Rakuten Monkeys of the Chinese Professional Baseball League. However, he opted out of his contract prior to the season due to family reasons.

Los Angeles Dodgers
On May 1, 2021, Wilkerson signed a minor league contract with the Los Angeles Dodgers organization. He appeared in 23 games (19 starts) for the Triple-A Oklahoma City Dodgers and was 8–5 with a 3.86 ERA.
He became a free agent following the season.

Hanshin Tigers
On December 7, 2021, Wilkerson signed with the Hanshin Tigers of Nippon Professional Baseball. Wilkerson made 14 appearances for Hanshin, pitching to a 5-5 record and 4.08 ERA with 54 strikeouts across 70.2 innings of work. He became a free agent following the 2022 season.

Leones de Yucatán
On February 21, 2023, Wilkerson signed with the Leones de Yucatán of the Mexican League.

References

External links

1989 births
Living people
Baseball players from Fort Worth, Texas
Biloxi Shuckers players
Colorado Springs Sky Sox players
Cumberland Phoenix baseball players
Florence Freedom players
Fort Worth Cats players
Gigantes del Cibao players
American expatriate baseball players in the Dominican Republic
Grand Prairie AirHogs players
Greenville Drive players
Lowell Spinners players
Major League Baseball pitchers
Mesa Solar Sox players
Milwaukee Brewers players
Pawtucket Red Sox players
Portland Sea Dogs players
Salem Red Sox players
San Antonio Missions players
Scottsdale Scorpions players
United States national baseball team players
Oklahoma City Dodgers players